Steven Gontarski (born 1972) is a sculptor from Philadelphia whose work has been included in solo and group exhibitions at the Institute of Contemporary Arts, Kunsthalle Wien, White Cube gallery and the Groninger Museum. Gontarski is a graduate of Brown University and Goldsmiths College, University of London.

In 2008, Gontarski created Ob 8, a bright red abstract sculpture which stands 5 metres high and is made of painted and lacquered glass-fibre-reinforced plastic. The organic shape of the work has been described as "recognisable but not identifiable, conjuring comparisons to many things in the real world: clouds, organs, oceans, smoke rings."

Solo exhibitions
2010
I woke up to the sound of a drum, Gimpel Fils, London
Ob 08, Central Saint Giles, London

2008 Steven Gontarski, Paddington Central, Phase II, London

2007
Sculptures, Gimpel Fils, London
Portraits, Changing Role, Rome
Obélisques CC/BS, Nouveaux Commanditaires, Chaucenne, France

2006
Steven Gontarski, pkm gallery, Seoul
Steven Gontarski, Changing Role, Naples
Day of St George, White Cubicle - George and Dragon, London
Steven Gontarski - Centre d’Art Mobile, L’Eglise de Fouvent et Roche en Haute-Saône

2005
The Visitors, Groninger Museum, Groningen

2004
December Morning Prophecy, White Cube, London
Zero, The Economist Plaza, London
Steven Gontarski, Gandy Gallery, Prague

2003
Prophet, Karyn Lovegrove Gallery, Los Angeles
Steven Gontarski, Le Consortium, Dijon

2002
Epsilon Delta, Art at Habitat, Habitat Kensington, London

2001
Sun Valley, One in the Other, London

2000
Steven Gontarski, White Cube, London
Steven Gontarski. The Unbalance of Boredom, Taché-Lévy Gallery, Brussels
L.A.X., Islington Business and Design Centre, London

1999
Nurse, Johnen & Schöttle Gallery, Cologne

References

Living people
20th-century American sculptors
1972 births
Brown University alumni
Alumni of Goldsmiths, University of London
21st-century American sculptors